Price House may refer to:

Major Edward Preston Price House, Butler County, Alabama, listed on the Alabama Register of Landmarks and Heritage
McCullough–Price House, Chandler, Arizona
W.Y. Price House, Florence, Arizona, listed on the National Register of Historic Places (NRHP)
Wynn-Price House, Garland, Arkansas
Acacia Lodge, Montecito, California, also known as the Shourds-Price House
John Price House, Pismo Beach, California
Dr. Price House, Live Oak, Florida
William Price House, Columbus, Georgia, formerly listed on the NRHP
Dan Price House, Paris, Idaho, listed on the NRHP
Fred Price House, Paris, Idaho, listed on the NRHP
Herber Price House, Paris, Idaho, listed on the NRHP
Joe Price House, Paris, Idaho, listed on the NRHP
Robert Price House, Paris, Idaho, listed on the NRHP
Dr. A.D. Price House, Harrodsburg, Kentucky, listed on the NRHP
Pugh Price House, Lexington, Kentucky, listed on the NRHP
Williamson Price House, Lexington, Kentucky, listed on the NRHP
Brown-Price House, Lansing, Michigan, listed on the NRHP
Price-Crawford House, Lafayette County, Mississippi, a Mississippi Landmark
Benjamin Price House, Elizabeth, New Jersey
Price–Brittan House, Elizabeth, New Jersey
Hillside (Greensboro, North Carolina), also known as the Julian Price House
Jonathan Price House, Clinton, Ohio
O.L. Price House, Portland, Oregon, listed on the NRHP
Piper-Price House, Philadelphia, Pennsylvania
Joseph Price House, West Whiteland Township, Pennsylvania
George R. Price House, Columbia, South Carolina
Raymond Price House, Columbia, South Carolina
Price's Post Office, Spartanburg County, South Carolina, also known as the Price House
Dr. Thomas H. Price House, Covington, Tennessee, listed on the NRHP
McClendon-Price House, Austin, Texas, a Recorded Texas Historic Landmark
R. H. and Martha Price House, Georgetown, Texas, listed on the NRHP
Cates-Price House, Palacios, Texas, a Recorded Texas Historic Landmark
Price-Farwell House, Palacios, Texas, listed on the NRHP
John and Margaret Price House, Salt Lake City, Utah, listed on the NRHP
Lorenzo and Emma Price House and Barn, Salt Lake City, Utah, listed on the NRHP
Governor Samuel Price House, Lewisburg, West Virginia
D.I.B. Anderson Farm, Morgantown, West Virginia, also known as the Chauncey M. Price House
Bushrod Washington Price House, Moundsville, West Virginia
R. T. Price House, Williamson, West Virginia